The 41st NAACP Image Awards ceremony, presented by the National Association for the Advancement of Colored People (NAACP), honored the best in film, television, music of 2009 and took place on February 26, 2010 at the Shrine Auditorium. The show was televised live on Fox and hosted by Hill Harper and Anika Noni Rose.

The nominees are listed below with the winners in bold.

Motion Picture

Outstanding Motion Picture
 Precious
 The Blind Side
 Invictus
 Michael Jackson's This Is It
 The Princess and the Frog

Outstanding Actor in a Motion Picture
*Morgan Freeman - Invictus
Denzel Washington - The Taking of Pelham 123
Idris Elba - Obsessed
Jamie Foxx - Law Abiding Citizen
Quinton Aaron - The Blind Side

Outstanding Actress in a Motion Picture
*Gabourey Sidibe - Precious
Sandra Bullock - The Blind Side
Taraji P. Henson - Tyler Perry's I Can Do Bad All By Myself
Sophie Okonedo - Skin
Anika Noni Rose - The Princess and the Frog

Outstanding Supporting Actor in a Motion Picture
*Adam Rodriguez - Tyler Perry's I Can Do Bad All By Myself
Chiwetel Ejiofor - 2012
Danny Glover - 2012
Lenny Kravitz - Precious
Anthony Mackie - The Hurt Locker

Outstanding Supporting Actress in a Motion Picture
*Mo'Nique - Precious
Mariah Carey - Precious
Paula Patton - Precious
Zoe Saldana - Avatar
Alfre Woodard - American Violet

Outstanding Independent Motion Picture
*Precious
American Violet
Amreeka
Endgame
Medicine for Melancholy

Outstanding Foreign Motion Picture
 The Stoning of Soraya M.
 The Maid
 Rudo y Cursi
 Sin Nombre
 Skin

Outstanding Documentary
 Good Hair
 Capitalism: A Love Story
 Crips and Bloods: Made in America
 Crude
 More Than a Game

Television

Outstanding Comedy Series
Tyler Perry's House of Payne
 30 Rock
 Everybody Hates Chris
 Glee
 Ugly Betty

Outstanding Actor in a Comedy Series
 Daryl Mitchell - Brothers
LaVan Davis - Tyler Perry's House of Payne
Donald Faison - Scrubs
Dulé Hill - Psych
Tyler James Williams - Everybody Hates Chris

Outstanding Actress in a Comedy Series
 Cassi Davis - Tyler Perry's House of Payne
Tichina Arnold - Everybody Hates Chris
America Ferrera - Ugly Betty
C.C.H. Pounder - Brothers
Sherri Shepherd - Sherri

Outstanding Supporting Actor in a Comedy Series
 Lance Gross - Tyler Perry's House of Payne
Tracy Morgan - 30 Rock
Lamman Rucker - Tyler Perry's House of Payne
Larenz Tate - Rescue Me
Malcolm-Jamal Warner - Sherri

Outstanding Supporting Actress in a Comedy Series
 Keshia Knight Pulliam - Tyler Perry's House of Payne
 Tisha Campbell-Martin - Rita Rocks
 Ana Ortiz - Ugly Betty
 Wendy Raquel Robinson - The Game
 Vanessa Williams - Ugly Betty

Outstanding Drama Series
 Lincoln Heights
 Cold Case
 Grey's Anatomy
 HawthoRNe
 The No.1 Ladies Detective Agency

Outstanding Actor in a Drama Series
Hill Harper - CSI: NY
 Anthony Anderson - Law & Order
 Taye Diggs - Private Practice
 Laurence Fishburne - CSI: Crime Scene Investigation
 LL Cool J - NCIS: Los Angeles

Outstanding Actress in a Drama Series
 Jada Pinkett Smith - HawthoRNe
 Regina King - Southland
 Sandra Oh - Grey's Anatomy
 Jill Scott - The No.1 Ladies Detective Agency
 Chandra Wilson - Grey's Anatomy

Outstanding Supporting Actor in a Drama Series
 Delroy Lindo - Law & Order: Special Victims Unit
 Rocky Carroll - NCIS
 Mekhi Phifer - Lie to Me
 James Pickens Jr. - Grey's Anatomy
 Corey Reynolds - The Closer

Outstanding Supporting Actress in a Drama Series
 S. Epatha Merkerson - Law & Order
 Audra McDonald - Private Practice
 Anika Noni Rose - The No.1 Ladies Detective Agency
 Gabrielle Union - Flash Forward
 Jurnee Smollett - Friday Night Lights

Outstanding Television Movie, Mini-Series, or Dramatic Special
 Gifted Hands
 America
 Brick City
 Georgia O'Keeffe
 Relative Stranger

Outstanding Actor in a Television Movie, Mini-Series, or Dramatic Special
Cuba Gooding Jr. - Gifted Hands
Eriq La Salle - Relative Stranger
Gus Hoffman - Gifted Hands
 Jaishon Fisher - Gifted Hands
Phillip Johnson - America

Outstanding Actress in a Television Movie, Mini-Series, or Dramatic Special
Kimberly Elise - Gifted Hands
Aunjanue Ellis - Gifted Hands
Cicely Tyson - Relative Stranger
Rosie O'Donnell - America
Ruby Dee - America

Outstanding Actor in a Daytime Drama Series
*Cornelius Smith Jr. - All My Children
Bryton James - The Young and the Restless
Cassius Willis - The Young and the Restless
Terrell Tilford - One Life to Live
Texas Battle - The Bold and the Beautiful

Outstanding Actress in a Daytime Drama Series
*Debbi Morgan - All My Children
Daphnee Duplaix - One Life to Live
Eva Marcille - The Young and the Restless
Tatyana Ali - The Young and the Restless
Tonya Lee Williams - The Young and the Restless

Outstanding News/Information - (Series or Special)
 The Inauguration of Barack Obama, 44th President of the United States
 Anderson Cooper 360: President Obama's African Journey
 CNN Presents: Reclaiming the Dream 2
 Judge Mathis
 Leading Women: India.Arie, Dr. Maya Angelou

Outstanding Talk Series
*The Mo'Nique Show
Lopez Tonight
The Tyra Banks Show
The View
The Wanda Sykes Show

Outstanding Reality Series
*Extreme Makeover: Home Edition
American Idol
America's Next Top Model
Dancing with the Stars
Real Housewives of Atlanta

Outstanding Variety
 The Michael Jackson Memorial: Celebrating the Life of Michael Jackson
 BET Awards 2009
 Bill Cosby: The Kennedy Center Mark Twain Prize for American Humor
 Wanda Sykes: I'ma Be Me
 We Are One: The Obama Inaugural Celebration at the Lincoln Memorial

Outstanding Children's Program
*Dora the Explorer
The Backyardigans
Go, Diego, Go
True Jackson, VP
Wizards of Waverly Place: The Movie

Outstanding Performance in a Youth/Children's Program - (Series or Special)
 Keke Palmer - True Jackson VP
 Caitlin Sanchez - Dora the Explorer
 LaShawn Jefferies - The Backyardigans
Nick Cannon - 2009 Nickelodeon HALO Awards
 Selena Gomez - Wizards of Waverly Place

Writing

Outstanding Writing in a Comedy Series
*The Office
Brothers
The Game
The Simpsons
Psych

Outstanding Writing in a Dramatic Series
*Grey's Anatomy
True Blood
Lincoln Heights
House
Grey's Anatomy

Outstanding Writing in a Motion Picture
*Precious
Invictus
The Blind Side
Notorious
Tyler Perry's I Can Do Bad All By Myself

Directing

Outstanding Directing for a Comedy Series
*30 Rock
Community
Drop Dead Diva
Everybody Hates Chris
The Office

Outstanding Directing for a Dramatic Series
*Grey's Anatomy
Battlestar Galactica
CSI: Crime Scene Investigation
Dexter
Lincoln Heights

Outstanding Directing for a Motion Picture
*Precious
Law Abiding Citizen
Notorious
Black Dynamite
Passing Stranger: The Movie

Recording

Outstanding New Artist
*Keri Hilson
Jeremih
K'Jon
Kristinia DeBarge
Melanie Fiona

Outstanding Male Artist
*Maxwell
Anthony Hamilton
Charlie Wilson
Jay-Z
Ne-Yo

Outstanding Female Artist
*Mary J. Blige
Alicia Keys
India.Arie
Rihanna
Whitney Houston

Outstanding Duo, Group, or Collaboration
 The Black Eyed Peas
 3 Mo' Divas
 Day26
 Jay-Z featuring Alicia Keys - "Empire State of Mind
 Jay-Z featuring Rihanna and Kanye West - "Run This Town"

Outstanding Jazz Album
*He and She - Wynton Marsalis
Detroit - Gerald Wilson Orchestra
Kind of Brown - Christian McBride & Inside Straight
Poetically Justified - Marcus Johnson
The Real Thing - Vanessa Williams

Outstanding Gospel Album
*Still - BeBe & CeCe Winans
A City Called Heaven - Shirley Caesar
How I Got Over - Vickie Winans
Love Unstoppable - Fred Hammond
We Are All One: Live In Detroit - Donnie McClurkin

Outstanding Music Video
*I Look to You - Whitney Houston
Blame It - Jamie Foxx featuring T-Pain
Boom Boom Pow - The Black Eyed Peas
Pretty Wings - Maxwell
Try Sleeping with a Broken Heart - Alicia Keys

Outstanding Song
*God in Me - Mary Mary
Bad Habits - Maxwell
Blame It - Jamie Foxx featuring T-Pain
Empire State of Mind - Jay-Z featuring Alicia Keys
Pretty Wings - Maxwell

Outstanding Album
*Stronger with Each Tear - Mary J. Blige
The Blueprint 3 - Jay-Z
BLACKsummers'night - Maxwell
The Element of Freedom - Alicia Keys
Memoirs of an Imperfect Angel - Mariah Carey

References

NAACP Image Awards
N
N
N